The following is a list of sports venues, ordered by capacity; i.e. the maximum number of spectators the venue can normally accommodate. All venues with a capacity of 40,000 or more are included.  Venues that are closed, defunct, or no longer serve as sports venues, are not included. Italics indicate historical regular tenant.

See also
Lists of sports venues

References

External links
 Top 10 Largest Football Stadiums La Liga Spain